The Council of Justice is a 1908 thriller novel by the British writer Edgar Wallace. It is a sequel to the 1905 novel The Four Just Men, and continues the adventures of the heroes of that work. It was followed by four further sequels.

References

Bibliography
 Jonathan Freedman. The Temple of Culture: Assimilation and Anti-Semitism in Literary Anglo-America. Oxford University Press, 2002.

1908 British novels
Novels by Edgar Wallace
British thriller novels